Podolovka is a rural locality (a selo) in Kupriyanovsky Selsoviet of Zavitinsky District, Amur Oblast, Russia. The population was 172 as of 2018. There are 2 streets.

Geography 
Podolovka is located 34 km southwest of Zavitinsk (the district's administrative centre) by road. Fyodorovka is the nearest rural locality.

References 

Rural localities in Zavitinsky District